Arbana may refer to:

Arbanë, village in the former municipality of Vaqarr in Tirana County, Albania

People with the name Arbana
Arbana Xharra,  Albanian journalist
Arbana Osmani (born 1983),  Albanian television presenter and radio personality
Reshat Arbana (born 1940), Albanian actor

See also
Arbanas (disambiguation)